James Henry Legge Dutton, 3rd Baron Sherborne (30 May 1804 – 8 March 1883), was a British peer.

Background
Sherborne was the son of John Dutton, 2nd Baron Sherborne, of Sherborne, Gloucestershire, by his wife, Hon. Mary Bilson Legge (1780–1864), daughter of Henry Legge, 2nd Baron Stawell and Hon. Mary Curzon.

Family
Lord Sherborne married Lady Elizabeth Howard (1803–1845), daughter of Thomas Howard, 16th Earl of Suffolk and Hon. Elizabeth Jane Dutton, on 22 June 1826. They had eleven children:

Henry James Legge Dutton (d. 1830).
Elizabeth Esther Dutton (1827–1829).
John William Dutton (1828–1858).
Edward Dutton, 4th Baron Sherborne (1831–1919), married Emily Teresa de Stern (1846–1905).
Hon. Julia Henrietta Dutton (1832–1890).
Emily Isabella Constance Dutton (1834–1890), married Edwin Corbett (1819–1888) HBM Minister, Stockholm, Sweden
Mary Laura Dutton (1836–1859).
James Robert Dutton (1838–1857).
Frederick Dutton, 5th Baron Sherborne (1840–1920).
Col. Hon. Charles Dutton (1842–1909), married May Arbuthnot Taylor (1849–1943).  Father of James Dutton, 6th Baron Sherborne.
Henry Thomas Dutton (1844–1857).

Secondly, Lord Sherborne married Susan Block (1829–1907), daughter of James Block.

Lord Sherborne was Provincial Grand Master of Gloucestershire of the Freemasons (1855–1880).  His favorite living place was Bibury Manor which is now a hotel, Bibury Court Hotel.  He was an avid race horse breeder and active member of The Bibury Club, the world's oldest racing club, which was formed in 1681 and held race meetings on Macaroni Downs above the small village of Bibury until the early part of the twentieth century. He also had a London home in Grosvenor Square. Sherborne died on 8 March 1883, aged 78, and was succeeded in the barony by his son, Edward.

References

1804 births
1883 deaths
James 3